Melipotis januaris, the January melipotis moth, is a species of moth in the family Erebidae. It was first described by Achille Guenée in 1852. The species has a wide range in the New World and has been recorded from Saint Kitts, Montserrat, Dominica, Saint Lucia, Saint Vincent, Grenada, the Greater Antilles, Florida and from Mexico to Paraguay.

The wingspan is about 35 mm. It is a highly variable species. Some specimens show a strongly contrasting pattern whilst others are more uniform.

The larvae feed on Inga laurina.

References

Moths described in 1852
Melipotis